KeVonn Mabon (born October 2, 1993) is an American football wide receiver. He played college football at Ball State.

Professional career

Tennessee Titans
Mabon signed with the Tennessee Titans as an undrafted free agent on May 11, 2017. He was waived by the Titans on September 2, 2017.

Indianapolis Colts
On November 9, 2017, Mabon was signed to the Indianapolis Colts' practice squad. He was released on November 13, 2017.

References

External links
Ball State Cardinals bio

1993 births
Living people
American football wide receivers
Ball State Cardinals football players
Tennessee Titans players
Indianapolis Colts players